This article relates to historical and current and separatist movements within Australia. Separatism includes the seeking of autonomy and secessionism.

List of movements

Western Australia 

Various attempts for secession have occurred in Western Australia, including the 1933 Western Australian secession referendum, and a number of more recent movements have continued proposing and pushing for independence, including the Western Australia Secessionist Movement

Murrawarri Republic 

Murrawarri Republic is a micronation in Australia created by an ethnic/racial Indigenous group that has been pushing for independence of Indigenous Australians.

Indigenous Australians 
Various proposals have been created to grant Indigenous Australians their own ethnostate, and have also proposed additional autonomous for aboriginal groups that hold native title land over various areas of Australia. The Aboriginal Tent Embassy has demanded that the government give Aboriginals control of the Northern Territory as a state, mining rights to all aboriginal reserve lands and settlements, compensation money for lands not returnable to take the form of a down-payment of A$6 Billion and an annual percentage of the gross national income.

Norfolk Island 
Norfolk Islanders propose that Norfolk Island returns to being a self-governed after its Legislative Assembly was removed by the Australian Government in 2015.

Tasmania 
Tasmania, historically an independent colony which joined the Commonwealth of Australia which has had various support groups that have proposed secessionism in Tasmania, with Labor Premier Doug Lowe and Liberal Premier Robin Gray seriously considered secession. In the 1990s the First Party of Tasmania was formed, which aimed for Tasmanian secession.

References 

Separatism in Australia